Matt Cornish (born 13 March 1997) is an English rugby union player who plays for London Irish in the Premiership Rugby.

Cornish progressed through the Ealing Trailfinders academy system whilst playing for amateur side London Irish Wild Geese back in London & South East Premier. Cornish made his senior debut when he came off the bench in the British and Irish Cup against Rotherham Titans in February 2016.

He was called up to the England Counties for a three-match test series in Canada back in June 2016, after represented Surrey in the 2016 Bill Beaumont Cup.

Cornish emergence with the Trailfinders, and after an impressive 2016-17 campaign with the side, in which he made 23 appearances and scored two tries, he has earned his first fulltime contract with the club.

In 2018, he was an ever-present in the Ealing matchday squad and played a key role in winning the 2017–18 British and Irish Cup in a memorable final against Leinster. On 14 February 2019, Cornish signed a new deal with Ealing Trailfinders for the 2019–20 season.

On 29 July 2020, Cornish moves up to the Premiership Rugby with London Irish from the 2020–21 season.

References

External links
ESPN Profile
Its Rugby Profile
Ultimate Rugby Profile

1997 births
Living people
English rugby union players
Ealing Trailfinders Rugby Club players
London Irish players
Rugby union players from Surrey
Rugby union hookers